Marcantonio De Beaumont-Bonelli was a sailor from Italy, who represented his country at the 1928 Summer Olympics in Amsterdam, Netherlands.

Sources
 

Italian male sailors (sport)
Sailors at the 1928 Summer Olympics – 8 Metre
Olympic sailors of Italy
1890 births
Year of death missing